Torwomenye Kwasi Mawuli Azaglo (TK) (born 28 September 1987) is a Ghanaian youth advocate and humanitarian, Founder and President of Future of Africa (FOA) and the former Associate Dean of Students and Community Affairs at Ashesi University. He obtained his Secondary School Education at Akosombo International School, later moved to Canada where he studied at Columbia International College and was enrolled in Wilfrid Laurier University Ontario in 2006.While a student, he founded the campus club Future of Africa to educate Canadian students on their misconceptions about Africa and take students on service learning trips to African countries. It has since grown into an organization with over 200 street children as beneficiaries of his program. Upon graduation in 2011, he worked at Wilfrid Laurier University from 2012 to 2014 and moved to Ghana and started work at Ashesi University in 2015. In February 2018, he took a leave of absence from Ashesi University, to focus on building his organisation.

Early life
TK was born in Accra, Ghana, to Anthony Azaglo a worker for the United Nations Assistance Mission in Somalia, and Fafali Azaglo a local food processor. TK's family hails originally from Lolito in the Volta Region of Ghana. He completed his Secondary Education at Akosombo International School, where he studied from 2002 to 2005. Later on, he moved to Canada and studied at Columbia International College for a year. In 2006, he gained admission to study at Wilfrid Laurier University Ontario -Canada. He graduated in 2011 with a BA in Political Science and Global Studies. Moved back to Ghana in 2014 to follow his dream of building an NGO dedicated to African development issues.

Career
 January 2012- February 2014 
International Recruitment and Admissions Coordinator, Wilfrid Laurier University, Ontario, Canada.

  February 2014- December 2014
Global Engagement Coordinator, Wilfrid Laurier University, Ontario, Canada.

 February 2015- July 2015

Citizen Engagement Coordinator, Sunyani, Savelugu, Hohoe, Ghana.
September 2015–February 2017

Assistant Dean of Students & Community Affairs, Ashesi University Accra, Ghana.

February 2017–February 2019

Associate Dean of Students & Community Affairs, Ashesi University Accra, Ghana.

 October 2008 – Present

President and Founder Future of Africa, Accra, Ghana.

Philanthropy
Future of Africa is a charity organization that seeks to support the growth and development of young people living in rural areas and in the streets. They currently have about 115 street children registered under the program and run weekly leadership programs, street outreach and a partnership with Smile Child Academy in Lolito Volta Region Ghana. TK started this initiative as a student club at Wilfrid Laurier University, one other university and a high school, dedicated to raising awareness and supporting initiatives of development. The club has ever since grown and He has succeeded in sending some of these children to school and is working on building a school for them in the Volta region.

Achievements and Awards
In 2011, TK was nominated for the Student Leadership in Internationalization Award from the Canadian Bureau for International Education. This was on the basis of his work with regards to Future of Africa. On 23 October 2011, in Ottawa, he was awarded at the bureau's annual award conference. TK's work at Ashesi University as the Associate Dean of Students and Community Affairs gave him recognition as the Most Outstanding Staff at the 7th and 8th Student Council Ubora Awards.

References

Wilfrid Laurier University
Academic staff of Ashesi University
Living people
People from Accra
1987 births